Shaquania Dorsett (born 16 September 1997) is a Bahamian sprinter. She competed in the women's 4 × 400 metres relay at the 2017 World Championships in Athletics. In 2014, she competed in the girls' 400 metres event at the 2014 Summer Youth Olympics held in Nanjing, China.

References

External links
 

1997 births
Living people
Bahamian female sprinters
World Athletics Championships athletes for the Bahamas
Place of birth missing (living people)
Athletes (track and field) at the 2014 Summer Youth Olympics